Bunnik is a municipality and village in the province of Utrecht, Netherlands. The recorded history of the village dates back nearly 2000 years, when the Romans constructed a fort at Fectio (now Vechten) with a harbour facing the river Rhine, which marked the border of the Roman Empire. The fort developed into a thriving trading centre, which continued to exist after the Romans abandoned the fort in the fourth century. Subsequently, the area was occupied by the Frisians and the Franks. In the 8th and 9th century, the villages of Bunninchem (Bunnik), Lodichem (Odijk) and Wercundia (Werkhoven) developed.

Chief interests of Bunnik are its surrounding nature, consisting mainly of forests and farmlands. Additionally, Bunnik, hosts the oldest Youth Hostel in the Netherlands. The major European construction and services company Royal BAM Group has its headquarters in Bunnik.

Population centres 
The municipality of Bunnik consists of the following cities, towns, villages and/or districts: Bunnik, Odijk, Werkhoven.

Topography

Dutch Topographic map of the municipality of Bunnik, June 2015.

Transportation
Bunnik railway station

Notable people 

 Jacob Pieter van Braam (1737 in Werkhoven – 1803) a Dutch admiral
 Andreas Everardus van Braam Houckgeest (1739 in Werkhoven – 1801) a Dutch-American merchant in China
 John Oostrom (born 1930 in Werkhoven) the first Dutch-born Canadian parliamentarian
 Coby van Baalen (born 1957 in Werkhoven) an equestrian, team silver medallist at the 2000 Summer Olympics
 Katja Schuurman (born 1975 in Bunnik) a Dutch actress, singer and TV personality
 Birgit Schuurman (born 1977) a Dutch singer and actress, brought up in Bunnik
 Jaap Stockmann (born 1984 in Bunnik) a retired Dutch field hockey goalkeeper who played for the Dutch national team

Gallery

References

External links 

Official website

 
Municipalities of Utrecht (province)
Populated places in Utrecht (province)